Paul John Flory (June 19, 1910 – September 9, 1985) was an American chemist and Nobel laureate who was known for his work in the field of polymers, or macromolecules.  He was a leading pioneer in understanding the behavior of polymers in solution, and won the Nobel Prize in Chemistry in 1974 "for his fundamental achievements, both theoretical and experimental, in the physical chemistry of macromolecules".

Biography

Personal life
Flory was born in Sterling, Illinois, on June 19, 1910. He was raised by Ezra Flory and Nee Martha Brumbaugh. His father worked as a clergyman-educator, and his mother was a school teacher. He first gained his interest in science from Carl W Holl, who was a professor in chemistry. Holl was employed in Indiana at Manchester College as a chemistry professor.  In 1936, he married Emily Catherine Tabor. He and Emily had three children together; Susan Springer, Melinda Groom and Paul John Flory jr. They also had five grandchildren. All of his children pursued careers in the field of science. After graduating from Elgin High School in Elgin, Illinois in 1927, Flory received a bachelor's degree from Manchester College (Indiana) (now Manchester University) in 1931 and a Ph.D. from the Ohio State University in 1934.  His first position was at DuPont with Wallace Carothers. He was posthumously inducted into the Alpha Chi Sigma Hall of Fame in 2002. Flory died on September 9, 1985 due to a massive heart attack. His wife Emily died in 2006 aged 94.

Schooling 
Flory attended graduate school at the Ohio State University. He originally entered the University under the major of just physical science. The research for his work included the studies of photochemistry and spectroscopy. He completed his Ph.D. at Ohio State University in 1934. Durings his studies at Ohio State University, he discovered the understanding that as temperature decreases, the polymer ends up contracting. This leads to the establishment of forces balancing one another's temperature. He ended up with receiving a master's degree in organic chemistry. He received his masters in organic chemistry, rather than physics due to insecurity. After facing his fear, he was able to graduate in 1934 with his doctorate in physical chemistry. While receiving his doctorate, he was supervised by Herriacc Johnston with his thesis on photochemistry of nitric oxide. In 1934, after receiving his Ph.D, he joined the Central Department of Dupont and Company. Throughout this organization he gained an interest in the fundamentals of polymerization and polymeric systems. Flory discovered that polymers that are valid objects of scientific were proved contagious. He proved the hypothesis by Staudinger and Carothers, “polymers are in fact covalently linked macromolecules”. After the death of Carother in 1937, Flory was involved for two years at the Research Laboratory located in the University of Cincinnati.

Work 

During the time of World War II, there was a need for research having to do with the development of synthetic rubber. Flory became reinvolved with the industry work. The first industry we worked from 1940 to 1943 was Standard Oil Development Company. Which is located in Linden, NJ. Working here helped with his development of mechanical statistical theory of polymer mixtures. During 1943 to 1948 was the Research Laboratory of the Goodyear Tire and Rubber Company. In fact, he was the director of research at the Goodyear Tire and Rubber Company, leading the team for studies on polymers.

After working in the industry, Flory left to work at Cornell University for a lectureship. The lectureship was with the George Fisher Baker Non-Residents. During the lectureship, Flory was able to study and understand a way to treat the effect of the excluded volume. According the nobelprize.org polymers, “would be nonasymptotic with the length of the chain, that is the fear of the contribution by the exclusion of the segment of the chain from the space occupied would increase without a limit as the chain is lengthened. This was the volume on the configuration of polymer chains. In 1957, Flory and his family decided to make the move to Pittsburgh, Pennsylvania. The reason he and his family moved from New York to Pennsylvania was for him to be able to develop a program of basic research in chemistry at the Carnegie Mellon Institute. After his work at the Carnegie Mellon Institute, he accepted a professorship position at Stanford University in the department of chemistry. While he was at Stanford University, he changed his direction of research. The change of view in his studies has to do with the spatial configuration having to do with chain molecules. This have to do with configuration treatments having to do with chain molecules. The treatment is the dependent properties through mathematical methods. Not only is mathematical methods the only treatment but so is the thermodynamics of solutions. After his retirement he Flory remained still very active in the world of chemistry. He was a consultant for Dupont and IBM, not long after he retired. Flory also was involved with the study of the foundations in the Soviet Union started off by the professor MV Volkenstein and his collaborators. He also worked with the late professor of Kazuo Nagai in Japan. He felt the need to fight for scientists who were oppressed in various countries. In addition, he also spoke as the “Voice of America”, during a broadcast in Eastern Europe as well as Soviet Union. Flory also worked for the “Committee on Human Rights” which is known as the National Academy of Sciences from 1979 to 1984. During 1980, he worked as a delegate at the scientific forum in Hamburg.

Research 

After receiving his doctorate in 1934, he dealt with a variety of issues with physical chemistry. This having to do with the kinetics and mechanisms of polymeric substances. Having to do with the distribution of molar mass, solution of thermodynamics and hydrodynamics. In addition, during 1934, he also was able to discover that when polymeric chains will keep growing if they are mixed with other molecules when present. Flory also discovered the understanding of the term ‘theta.’ In other words, is the constant of hydrodynamic. With the theta point that is the neutral volumes interactions. In conclusion to the development of the theta point it has been confirmed and studied in a variety of laboratories by many scientists. Both natural and synthetic polymers have been studied throughout the theta point. Throughout this a better understanding of macromolecules was provided. It helped with the creation of basis under rational interpretations of physical measurements. The measurements have relations to both the solutions of polymers and quantitative characteristics. Some work completed by Paul Flory during his time includes the development in the quantitative correlations between the chain molecules and chemical structure of properties. This has to do with the way polymers are composed and what are composed of polymers. One piece of material formed through polymers is plastic. In the mid 1930s, Flory discovered how polymers are dissolved in a solvent. Leading to becoming outstretches which is caused by the forces of both polymers and solvent parts. He even had part finding a solution to polymers.

Career and polymer science
Flory's earliest work in polymer science was in the area of polymerization kinetics at the DuPont Experimental Station.  In condensation polymerization, he challenged the assumption that the reactivity of the end group decreased as the macromolecule grew, and by arguing that the reactivity was independent of the size, he was able to derive the result that the number of chains present decreased with size exponentially.  In addition polymerization, he introduced the important concept of chain transfer to improve the kinetic equations and remove difficulties in understanding the polymer size distribution.

In 1938, after Carothers' death, Flory moved to the Basic Science Research Laboratory at the University of Cincinnati.  There he developed a mathematical theory for the polymerization of compounds with more than two functional groups and the theory of polymer networks or gels.  This led to the Flory-Stockmayer theory of gelation, which equivalent to percolation on the Bethe lattice and in fact represents the first paper in the percolation field.

In 1940 he joined the Linden, NJ laboratory of the Standard Oil Development Company where he developed a statistical mechanical theory for polymer mixtures.    In 1943 he left to join the research laboratories of Goodyear as head of a group on polymer fundamentals.  In the Spring of 1948 Peter Debye, then chairman of the chemistry department at Cornell University, invited Flory to give the annual Baker Lectures.  He then was offered a position with the faculty in the Fall of the same year.  He was initiated into the Tau chapter of Alpha Chi Sigma at Cornell in 1949. At Cornell he elaborated and refined his Baker Lectures into his magnum opus, Principles of Polymer Chemistry which was published in 1953 by Cornell University Press.  This quickly became a standard text for all workers in the field of polymers, and is still widely used to this day.

Flory introduced the concept of excluded volume, coined by Werner Kuhn in 1934, to polymers. Excluded volume refers to the idea that one part of a long chain molecule can not occupy space that is already occupied by another part of the same molecule. Excluded volume causes the ends of a polymer chain in a solution to be further apart (on average) than they would be were there no excluded volume.  The recognition that excluded volume was an important factor in analyzing long-chain molecules in solutions provided an important conceptual breakthrough, and led to the explanation of several puzzling experimental results of the day. It also led to the concept of the theta point, the set of conditions at which an experiment can be conducted that causes the excluded volume effect to be neutralized. At the theta point, the chain reverts to ideal chain characteristics – the long-range interactions arising from excluded volume are eliminated, allowing the experimenter to more easily measure short-range features such as structural geometry, bond rotation potentials, and steric interactions between near-neighboring groups. Flory correctly identified that the chain dimension in polymer melts would have the size computed for a chain in ideal solution if excluded volume interactions were neutralized by experimenting at the theta point.

Among his accomplishments are an original method for computing the probable size of a polymer in good solution, the Flory-Huggins Solution Theory, and the derivation of the Flory exponent, which helps characterize the movement of polymers in solution.

The Flory convention
see Flory convention for details.
In modeling the position vectors of atoms in macromolecules it is often necessary to convert from Cartesian coordinates (x,y,z) to generalized coordinates. The Flory convention for defining the variables involved is usually employed. For an example, a peptide bond can be described by the x,y,z positions of every atom in this bond or the Flory convention can be used. Here one must know the bond lengths , bond angles , and the dihedral angles . Applying a vector conversion from the Cartesian coordinates to the generalized coordinates will describe the same three-dimensional structure using the Flory convention.

Awards and Honors 
Flory was elected to the United States National Academy of Sciences in 1953 and the American Academy of Arts and Sciences in 1957. In 1968, he received the Charles Goodyear Medal. He also received the Priestley Medal and the Golden Plate Award of the American Academy of Achievement in 1974. He received the Carl-Dietrich-Harries-Medal for commendable scientific achievements in 1977. Flory received the Nobel Prize in Chemistry in 1974 "for his fundamental achievements both theoretical and experimental, in the physical chemistry of the macromolecules." Additionally in 1974 Flory was awarded the National Medal of Science in Physical Sciences. The medal was presented to him by President Gerald Ford. This award was given to him because of his research on the "formation and structure of polymeric substances".

Published books 
With over 300 writings, both published and unpublished, throughout his lectureship at the University with the research and teaching led to his first published book. The book published by Cornell University was called the “Principles of Polymer Chemistry.” The book was then the basis use of information for undergrad students. It was the standard principle for many decades, used by many professors. 
Another book which was published by Flory was “Statistical Mechanics of Chain Molecules.” The book was published in 1969, worked to summarize different parts both molecules theories and applications. In 1985, the book written by Paul Flory called, “Selected Works of Paul Flory.” This summarized much of his work and studies.

Bibliography
Flory, Paul. (1953) Principles of Polymer Chemistry. Cornell University Press. .
Flory, Paul. (1969) Statistical Mechanics of Chain Molecules. Interscience. . Reissued 1989. .
Flory, Paul. (1985) Selected Works of Paul J. Flory. Stanford Univ Press. .

References 

Paul J. Flory – Facts. NobelPrize.org. Nobel Media AB 2019. Wed. 19 Jun 2019. <https://www.nobelprize.org/prizes/chemistry/1974/flory/facts/>
Somsen, Geert. Paul J Flory. Encyclopædia Britannica. June 15, 2019. https://www.britannica.com/biography/Paul-J-Flory
Paul John Flory. Stanford Chemistry. https://chemistry.stanford.edu/people/flory.

External links

 Chemistry Tree: Paul J. Flory Details
 A short autobiography of Paul Flory
Nobel lecture by Paul Flory

Paul J. Flory papers at the Hoover Institution Archives
National Academy of Sciences Biographical Memoir

1910 births
1985 deaths
People from Elgin, Illinois
People from Sterling, Illinois
American Nobel laureates
Nobel laureates in Chemistry
Ohio State University alumni
American physical chemists
National Medal of Science laureates
Polymer scientists and engineers
Fellows of the American Physical Society
Members of the American Philosophical Society